Shiliuzhuang Subdistrict is a subdistrict on eastern Fengtai District, Beijing, China. It shares border with Chengshousi Subdistrict and Shibalidian Township to the east, Donggaodi Subdistrict to the south, and Dahongmen Subdistrict to the west and north.

The subdistrict was created in 2021 from portions of Dongtiejiangying and Dahongmen Subdistricts. It took its name Shiliuzhuang from its historical location as an imperial pomegranate orchard.

History

Administrative Division 
As of 2021, Shiliuzhuang Subdistrict consisted of 16 subdivisions, pf which 15 were communities and 1 was a village:

Gallery

See also 

 List of township-level divisions of Beijing

References 

Fengtai District
Subdistricts of Beijing